This is a partial list of films produced in Hong Kong in 1957.

1957

References

External links
 IMDB list of Hong Kong films
 Hong Kong films of 1957 at HKcinemamagic.com

1957
Lists of 1957 films by country or language
Films